Lissemys is a genus of softshell turtles in the subfamily Cyclanorbinae of the family Trionychidae. The genus is indigenous to southern Asia.

Species
The genus Lissemys contains three extant species which are recognized as being valid.
Lissemys ceylonensis  – Sri Lankan flapshell turtle
Lissemys punctata  – Indian flapshell turtle
Lissemys scutata  – Burmese flapshell turtle

Several extinct fossil species have been described for this genus, such as Lissemys piramensis , from Piram Island, India, but these are largely considered nomen dubia. However, the extant Indian flapshell turtle (L. punctata) is known from fossils from as early as the Miocene.

Nota bene: A binomial authority in parentheses indicates that the species was originally described in a genus other than Lissemys.

References

Bibliography

Further reading
Smith, M. A. (1931). The Fauna of British India, Including Ceylon and Burma: Reptilia and Amphibia Volume I Loricata, Testudines. London: Secretary of State for India in Council. (Taylor and Francis, printers). xxviii + 185 pp. + Plates I-II. (Lissemys, new genus, p. 154).

 
Turtle genera